"Nude as the News" is a song by the American singer/songwriter Cat Power (a.k.a. Chan Marshall). It is the fourth song on her 1996 album, What Would the Community Think. It was released as a single, and a music video shot entirely in black and white and directed by Brett Vapnek.

A review in Vulture called the song both eerie and propulsive, saying that "it rolls like a long snarl." The song is autobiographical, telling the story of an abortion that Marshall had when she was twenty. The chorus lyric, "Jackson, Jesse, I've got a son in me", does not refer to the Reverend Jesse Jackson but rather the first names of the children of Patti Smith, one of Marshall's heroes.

The B-side "Schizophrenia's Weighted Me Down" is a composition of the two songs "Schizophrenia" by Sonic Youth and "Weighted Down (The Prison Song)" by Skip Spence.

Track listing
"Nude as the News" (Chan Marshall) – 4:23
"Schizophrenia's Weighted Me Down" – 2:49

References

1996 songs
Cat Power songs
Songs about abortion
Songs written by Cat Power
Matador Records singles